In Japan, each school has a different grading system. Many universities use the following set of categories:

Education in Japan has many different ways of approaching their grading system.

An interesting phenomenon is that even if an individual student fails a course, they may pass with their class regardless of grades on tests. The grades on tests have no effect on schooling until taking entrance exams to get into high school.

The motivation behind Japanese children's report card is not the grade, but their behavior "because the report card in modern Japan shows and evaluates more children's attitudes in their school life than their academic grades (Gordenker, 2001; Murata & Yamaguchi, 2010)." For example, Japanese students are graded how they greet each other in the morning, if they remember their supplies, and how they treat plants and animals.

High school level 
In order to attend high school in Japan, younger students must pass an entrance exam and if they do not pass, then they are not allowed to go to high school.

Most high schools in Japan have a numerical grading system from 5 to 1 with 5 being the highest grade and 1 being the lowest.

University level 
Like the high school level, Japanese students must pass a standardized test to be accepted into a university.

Most national universities employ a 4-scale grading system (only with A, B, C and F). Below-average students are given an F, and are encouraged to retake the same subject(s) in the following semesters.

GPA is a simple numerical representation of college results in Japan. As of 2014, 497 Japanese universities use this system.

For universities, graduation requires a minimum of 124 credits and the required number of credits for each university. To earn 1 credit, 45 hours of study time is required, including preparation and review time.

Note

References

大学の成績の評価での『優』の位置づけは？. (2017, September 12). Retrieved from http://houou-hane.net/post-274-2/

Japan
Grading
Grading